James Alan Groves  (December 17, 1952 – February 5, 2007) was a Hebrew Bible scholar, theologian, educator, and church elder. Born in Springfield, Missouri, he earned a Bachelor of Arts and Bachelor of Engineering from Dartmouth College in 1975, a Master of Arts in Religion and Master of Theology from Westminster Theological Seminary.

From 1976 to 1979, he served as pastor of the congregational church in West Fairlee, Vermont.  In 1978, Groves married Elizabeth ("Libbie") Wendell Davis of Springfield, Vermont.  They had four children - Alasdair, Rebeckah, Éowyn, and Alden.

Groves served in a number of capacities at Westminster Theological Seminary from 1982 until his death, including full professor of Old Testament and Academic Dean and Vice President of Academic Affairs (Academic Dean).

Computer technology and the study of the Hebrew Bible 
Groves was a pioneer and leader in the application of computing and related technology to the study and teaching of the Hebrew Bible and language, a field in which he is acknowledged as one of the earliest visionaries and most influential scholars.

In 1986, Groves founded the Westminster Hebrew Institute — a center for the study of Biblical Hebrew linguistics through computing, which in December 2006 (shortly before his death) was renamed the J. Alan Groves Center for Advanced Biblical Research.

He was editor or co-editor of numerous electronic databases, including the Groves-Wheeler Westminster Electronic Hebrew Morphology of Biblia Hebraica Stuttgartensia, the Stuttgart Electronic Study Bible, the Westminster-Claremont-Michigan Electronic Text of Biblia Hebraica Stuttgartensia, and the Biblia Hebraica Quinta.

The Groves-Wheeler Morphology is incorporated into a majority of commercially available Bible software products that provide study of original language translation, including Accordance, BART, BibleWindows, BibleWorks, Gramcord, Logos, and WordSearch.

References 

 J. Alan Groves Center for Advanced Biblical Research at Westminster Theological Seminary
 
 
 

2007 deaths
American Calvinist and Reformed theologians
American biblical scholars
Westminster Theological Seminary alumni
Westminster Theological Seminary faculty
1952 births
20th-century Calvinist and Reformed theologians
Old Testament scholars
People from Springfield, Missouri
Dartmouth College alumni
Presbyterian Church in America ministers
20th-century American clergy